Media Matters for America (MMfA) is a politically left-leaning 501(c)(3), nonprofit organization and media watchdog group. MMfA was founded in 2004 by journalist and political activist David Brock as a counterweight to the conservative Media Research Center. It is known for its aggressive criticism of conservative journalists and media outlets, including its "War on Fox News".

Founding
Media Matters for America was founded in May 2004 by David Brock, a former conservative journalist who has since become a prominent Democratic party political operative. Brock said that he founded the organization to combat the conservative journalism sector that he had once been a part of, although some critics say he has simply adopted the tactics of his part for a new political side. Brock further explained his motives for starting the group, telling The New York Times, that "the central thrust of his group would be to closely monitor conservative commentators and journalists and, when they make erroneous or misleading claims, to point them out and set the record straight."

Brock said he founded the organization because conservative "monitoring groups have helped build the conservative media's influence, in part by making mainstream journalists toe a more conservative line by convincing them that they are liberally biased... The right wing in this country has dominated the debate over liberal bias. By dominating that debate, my belief is they've moved the media itself to the right and therefore they've moved American politics to the right." He added, "I wanted to create an institution to combat what they're doing."
 
Brock founded the group with help from the Center for American Progress. Initial donors included Leo Hindery, Susie Tompkins Buell, and James Hormel.

Organization overview

Research
Media Matters analyzes American news sources including NBC, ABC, CBS, PBS, CNN, MSNBC, CNBC, OAN, Breitbart, the Fox News channel, and conservative talk radio. Its techniques include content analysis, fact checking, monitoring, and comparison of quotes or presentations from media figures to primary documents such as Pentagon or Government Accountability Office reports.

Beginning in 2006, Media Matters for America has released a number of studies which documented that Democrats and progressives are outnumbered by Republicans and conservatives in terms of guest appearances on television news programs.

On September 12, 2007, Media Matters released a comprehensive study of 1,377 U.S. newspapers and the 201 syndicated political columnists the papers carry on a regular basis. Media Matters said "in paper after paper, state after state, and region after region, conservative syndicated columnists get more space than their progressive counterparts."

John Diaz, editorial page editor of the San Francisco Chronicle, said by over-factoring conservative columns in smaller newspapers, Media Matters' study had overestimated how many conservative columns appeared in daily newspapers. Diaz said Media Matters had obscured the nuanced ideological positions of some columnists classified in the study as conservative.

An annual feature on the Media Matters website is the title of "Misinformer of the Year", which is given to the journalist, commentator, or network that Media Matters contends was responsible for the most factual errors or claims. Recipients of this award have included: Bill O'Reilly, Chris Matthews, ABC, Sean Hannity, Glenn Beck, Sarah Palin, Rupert Murdoch, Rush Limbaugh, CBS News, George Will, The Center for Medical Progress, the fake news ecosystem, and the alt-right.

Funding
MMfA began with the help of $2 million in donations. According to Byron York of the National Review, additional funding came from MoveOn.org and the New Democrat Network.

In 2004, MMfA received the endorsement of the Democracy Alliance, a partnership of wealthy and politically active progressive donors. The Alliance itself does not fund endorsees, but many wealthy Alliance members acted on the endorsement and donated directly to MMfA.

Media Matters has a policy of not comprehensively listing donors. In 2010, six years after the Democracy Alliance initially endorsed MMfA, financier George Soros — a founding and continuing member of the Alliance — announced that he was donating $1 million to MMfA. Soros said his concern over "recent evidence suggesting that the incendiary rhetoric of Fox News hosts may incite violence" had moved him to donate to MMfA. During a 2014 CNN interview, David Brock stated that Soros' contributions were "less than 10 percent" of Media Matters' budget. According to Politico, Brock's assertion was misleading: "Media Matters, however has received funding from or formed partnerships with several groups that Soros funds or has funded. These include the Tides Foundation, Democracy Alliance, Moveon.org and the Center for American Progress."

During the 2020 COVID-19 pandemic, the group received between $1 million and $2 million in federally backed small business loans from Bank of America as part of the Paycheck Protection Program. The organization stated it would help them retain 64 employees.

Personnel
John Podesta, the former chief of staff to President Bill Clinton, provided office space for Media Matters early in its formation at the Center for American Progress, a Democratic think tank which Podesta established in 2002. Hillary Clinton advised Media Matters in its early stages out of a belief that progressives should follow conservatives in forming think tanks and advocacy groups to support their political goals. According to The New York Times, Media Matters "helped lay the groundwork" for Hillary Clinton's 2016 presidential campaign.

Media Matters has hired several of the best known political professionals who have worked for Democratic politicians and for other progressive groups. In 2004, National Review referred to MMfA staffers who had recently worked on the presidential campaigns of John Edwards and Wesley Clark, for Congressman Barney Frank, and for the Democratic Congressional Campaign Committee.

Eric E. Burns served as MMFA's president until 2011. Burns was succeeded by Matt Butler, and then, in 2013, by Bradley Beychok. In late 2016, Angelo Carusone replaced Bradley Beychok as MMFA's president. Under Carusone, the organization's focus has shifted toward focusing on the alt-right, conspiracy theories, and fake news.

In 2014, the staff of Media Matters voted to join the Service Employees International Union (SEIU). Media Matters management had declined to recognize the union through a card check process, instead exercising its right to force a union election.

Initiatives
Established to "incubate a new generation of liberal pundits", MMFA's Progressive Talent Initiative trains potential pundits in media skills.

David Brock established Media Matters Action Network to track conservative politicians and organizations. Organized as a 501(c)(4) nonprofit group, the Media Matters Action Network can lobby and engage in political campaign work. In November 2010, The New York Times reported that it was "set to take on an expanded role in the 2012 elections, including potentially running television ads".

Brock established American Bridge 21st Century as a super PAC associated with Media Matters for America. Kathleen Kennedy Townsend, daughter of Robert F. Kennedy, and a former lieutenant governor of Maryland, chairs the board of directors of American Bridge. American Bridge is focused on opposition research.

In 2009, Media Matters Action Network launched the Conservative Transparency website, aimed at tracking the funding of conservative activist organizations. Media Matters Action Network established the Political Correction project with the goal of holding conservative politicians and advocacy groups accountable.

In December 2010, Media Matters Action Network started EqualityMatters.org, a site "in support of gay equality". At launch the site fully incorporated Media Matters's content on LGBT issues. Designed to provide talking points for liberal activists and politicians, Brock set up the Message Matters project. Media Matters runs the website DropFox.com and works to get advertisers to boycott Fox News. One target, Orbitz, initially referred to Media Matters' efforts as a "smear campaign", but agreed, on June 9, 2011, following a three-week campaign by prominent LGBT organizations, to "review the policies and process used to evaluate where advertising is placed". In 2015, the formal Equality Matters program was deactivated and merged with the LGBT Program within Media Matters.

Criticism of conservative media

Don Imus
On April 4, 2007, Media Matters posted a video clip of Don Imus calling the Rutgers University women's basketball team members "nappy-headed hoes" and made their discovery known in Media Matters' daily e-mailing to hundreds of journalists. The next day, according to The Wall Street Journal, "top news outlets didn't mention the incident." It was objections made to CBS Radio by the National Association of Black Journalists that led to an on-the-air apology from Imus. MSNBC, calling Imus's comments "racist" and "abhorrent", suspended Imus' show, and within minutes, CBS suspended Imus's radio show. The Wall Street Journal said Imus's apology "seemed to make matters worse, with critics latching on to Mr. Imus's use of the phrase 'you people.'" Included among those dissatisfied with Imus's apology and suspension were the coach of the Rutgers team and a group of MSNBC African-American employees. After Procter & Gamble pulled advertising from all of MSNBC's daytime schedule, and other advertisers, including General Motors and American Express requested CBS to cancel any upcoming advertising they had bought for "Imus in the Morning", MSNBC and CBS dropped Imus's show.

Rush Limbaugh "phony soldiers"

In September 2007, Media Matters reported on radio talk show host Rush Limbaugh saying Iraq War veterans opposed to the war as "the phony soldiers". Limbaugh later said he was speaking of only one soldier, Jesse MacBeth, who had falsely claimed to have been decorated for valor but had never seen combat. Limbaugh said he was the victim of a "smear" by Media Matters, which had taken out of context and selectively edited his comments. After Limbaugh published what he said was the entire transcript of phony soldiers discussion, Media Matters reported that over a minute and 30 seconds was omitted without "notation or ellipsis to indicate that there is, in fact, a break in the transcript." Limbaugh told National Review that the gap between referring to "phony soldiers" and MacBeth was a delay because his staff printed out an ABC news story that reported on what it called "phony soldiers" and that his transcript and audio edits were "for space and relevance reasons, not to hide anything."

The Associated Press, CNN, and ABC reported on the controversy, as political satirist and fictional pundit Stephen Colbert lampooned Limbaugh and his defenders saying: "Hey, Media Matters, you want to end offensive speech? Then stop recording it for people who would be offended."

Bill O'Reilly Harlem restaurant
In October 2007 television and radio host and commentator Bill O'Reilly said a Media Matters headline declaring "O'Reilly surprised 'there was no difference' between Harlem restaurant and other New York restaurants" took out of context comments he made regarding a pleasant dinner he shared with Al Sharpton at a Harlem restaurant. O'Reilly said Media Matters misleadingly took comments spoken five minutes apart and presented them as one. In an appearance on NBC's Today with Matt Lauer, Media Matters senior fellow Paul Waldman said Media Matters had included "the full audio, the full transcript, nothing was taken out of context".

Laura Schlessinger racial slur
On August 12, 2010, Media Matters reported that radio host Laura Schlessinger said the word "nigger" eleven times during a discussion with an African-American woman, although Schlessinger did not use the word as a slur. Schlessinger continued to say the word after the caller took offense, saying she thought the woman was being too sensitive and that a double standard was being used to determine who could say the word. Schlessinger also said that those "hypersensitive" about color should not "marry outside of their race". The caller had earlier in the discussion said her husband was white. Schlessinger apologized for the epithet the day after the broadcast. A joint statement of Media Matters and other organizations noted that although Schlessinger "attempted to apologize for using the epithet, the racist diatribe on Tuesday's show extends far beyond the use of a single word" and urged advertisers to boycott her show. After General Motors, OnStar, and Motel 6 pulled their advertising, Schlessinger said she would not renew her syndication contract set to expire December 2010. In January 2011 her show resumed on satellite radio.

Schlessinger held Media Matters responsible for the boycott, which she called a typical tactic of the group to fulfill its "sole purpose of silencing people". She said the boycotts' "threat of attack on my advertisers and stations" had violated her First Amendment free speech rights. Media Matters said that, as the boycott was not "government-sanctioned censorship", her First Amendment rights had not been violated.

War on Fox
In March 2010, MMfA declared a "War on Fox". David Brock said MMfA would focus its efforts on Fox and select conservative websites in what Brock called an "all-out campaign of 'guerrilla warfare and sabotage.'" MMfA said the greater attention given to Fox was part of a campaign to educate the public about what it regarded as the distortions of conservative media, and the greater attention given to Fox was in line with its prominence. MMfA said its Drop Fox campaign for advertisers to boycott Fox was also part of the organisation's educational mission. MMfA said that changing Fox, not shutting it down, was its goal.

In December 2013, the War on Fox was officially concluded, with MMfA Executive VP Angelo Carusone claiming the "War on Fox is over. And it's not just that it's over, but it was very successful. To a large extent, we won," claiming to have "effectively discredited the network's desire to be seen as 'fair and balanced.'" Around that time, Glenn Beck had departed the network and Sean Hannity's time slot was moved from 9 p.m. to 10 p.m.

Tucker Carlson audio recordings
In March 2019, MMfA released audio recordings of Fox News host Tucker Carlson, in which he made remarks demeaning to women between 2006 and 2011 on the call-in show hosted by shock jock Bubba The Love Sponge. Among other comments, Carlson called rape shield laws "unfair", defended Mormon fundamentalist church leader Warren Jeffs, who had been charged of child sexual assault, and called women "extremely primitive". After Carlson's remarks had been widely reported, Carlson tweeted: "Media Matters caught me saying something naughty on a radio show more than a decade ago" and declined to apologize. The following day, MMfA released a second set of audio recordings in which Carlson referred to Iraqis as "semiliterate primitive monkeys" and said they "don’t use toilet paper or forks." Carlson also suggested that immigrants to the U.S. should be "hot" or "really smart" and that white men "created civilization".

The Daily Caller, which Carlson co-founded, responded by resurfacing blog posts made by MMfA's president Angelo Carusone. These blog posts included derogatory comments about transvestites, Jews, and people from Japan and Bangladesh. Carusone responded by saying that posts were supposed to be a "caricature of what a right wing blowhard would sound like if he was living my life" and apologized for the "gross" remarks.

Reception
In 2008, columnist Jacques Steinberg of The New York Times quoted David Folkenflik of National Public Radio as telling him that although Media Matters looked "at every dangling participle, every dependent clause, every semicolon, every quotation" for the benefit of "a cause, a party, a candidate, that they may have some feelings for", they were still a useful source for leads, partly due to the "breadth of their research". Steinberg further explained: "Ripping a page from an old Republican Party playbook, Media Matters has given the Democrats a weapon they have not had in previous campaigns: a rapid-fire, technologically sophisticated means to call out what it considers 'conservative misinformation' on air or in print, then feed it to a Rolodex of reporters, cable channels and bloggers hungry for grist." Political analyst and columnist Stuart Rothenberg told Steinberg that he did not pay attention to Media Matters, as he had no confidence in "ideological stuff".

According to a 2010 opinion piece by "M. S." on the blog of The Economist magazine, "because it is dedicated to critiquing distortions by conservatives, its critiques carry no weight with conservatives."

Some news organizations have cited Media Matters reports and credited it for bringing attention to issues including the story of James Guckert, formerly a reporter for the web-based Talon News.  During George W. Bush's administration, Guckert gained White House press access using the pseudonym Jeff Gannon and attended 155 White House press briefings.  It was revealed that he had also worked as a prostitute soliciting male clientele on the Internet with photos of himself fully naked. Columnists and writers such as Paul Krugman and the late Molly Ivins cited Media Matters or identified it as a helpful source.

Criticism 
In 2015, Emma Roller in The Atlantic described MMFA as part of Brock's "three-pronged empire", along with the super PACs American Bridge 21st Century and Correct the Record. Roller wrote that the "ferocity with which Media Matters has defended Clinton can verge on the absurd." After Clinton's loss in the 2016 presidential election, Clio Chang and Alex Shephard wrote in The New Republic that "in our numerous conversations with past Media Matters staff, there was a consensus that in the lead-up to Clinton’s announcement of her candidacy in 2015, the organization’s priority shifted away from [its stated mission] towards running defense for Clinton" which "damaged Media Matters’s credibility and hurt its work in other areas that had previously been strongly respected."  They accused MMfA of lowering its research standards in defense of Hillary Clinton, writing "The organization had long ceased to be a mere watchdog, having positioned itself at the center of a group of public relations and advocacy outfits whose mission was to help put [Hillary] Clinton in the White House," the magazine concluded.

Media Matters has been criticized by conservative political commentator Ben Shapiro, who accused it of targeting those with opposing political views with boycotts. Media Matters has also been criticized for ignoring derogatory comments made by Joy Reid while focusing on comments made by Fox News hosts like Tucker Carlson and Laura Ingraham.

Tax-exempt status challenge
C. Boyden Gray, former White House counsel for George H. W. Bush and Fox consultant, sent a letter to the IRS in 2011 alleging that MMfA's activities including the War on Fox were not primarily educational, but instead "unlawful conduct" and asking for that MMfA's tax-exempt status to be revoked. Prior to Gray's IRS petition, Politico reported that Fox News had run "more than 30 segments calling for the nonprofit group to be stripped of its tax-exempt status." In another report, Politico said Fox News and Fox Business campaigns held, "The non-profit status as an educator is violated by partisan attacks. That sentiment was first laid out by a piece written by Gray for The Washington Times in June." In an interview with Fox News, Gray said "It's not unlawful. It's just not charitable."

MMfA vice-president Ari Rabin-Havt said "C. Boyden Gray is [a] Koch-affiliated, former Fox News contributor whose flights of fancy have already been discredited by actual experts in tax law." Gray denied having been on Fox's payroll while he was a Fox consultant in 2005, but at that time, Fox had said Gray was a contributor, adding: "We pay contributors for strong opinions." Marcus Owens, former director of the IRS's Exempt Organizations Division, told Politico in 2011 that he believed the law was on Media Matters's side. Owens told Fox Business that only an IRS probe could reveal if partisan activity takes up a substantial enough part of MMfA's operations to disallow its tax-free status; the IRS allows limited political activity at nonprofits if it does not take up a substantial amount of their operations.

Legal 
In June 2022, Media Matters threatened to file a lawsuit against a former long-time staff member of their group, who alleged that Media Matters covered up the sexual misconduct of another employee.

See also

 Accuracy in Media
 Fairness and Accuracy in Reporting
 Journalism ethics and standards
 Media bias
 Media bias in the United States
 People for the American Way
 Media monitoring service
 Political Research Associates

References

External links
 
 Media Matters Action Network website
 American Bridge website 
 

Media analysis organizations and websites
Political advocacy groups in the United States
Progressive organizations in the United States
Non-profit organizations based in Washington, D.C.
Organizations established in 2004
Opposition research